SM U-32 was a German Type U 31 U-boat of the Imperial German Navy.

Her construction was ordered on 29 March 1912 and her keel was laid down on 8 November 1912 by Germaniawerft of Kiel. She was launched on 28 January 1914 and commissioned on 3 September 1914 under the command of Edgar von Spiegel von und zu Peckelsheim. On 1 February 1916 Spiegel was relieved by Kurt Hartwig who commanded the boat until 16 February 1918 when Karl Albrecht took over. Albrecht commanded her until her loss.

U-32 conducted 11 patrols, sinking 37 merchant ships totalling  and one warship for 14,000 tons. On 9 January 1917, to the East of Malta, U-32 sank the British pre-dreadnought battleship , with the loss of 15 lives.

Design
German Type U 31 submarines were double-hulled ocean-going submarines similar to Type 23 and Type 27 subs in dimensions and differed only slightly in propulsion and speed. They were considered very good high sea boats with average manoeuvrability and good surface steering.

The U-boat was armed with four  torpedo tubes, two fitted in the bow and two in the stern, and carried 6 torpedoes. Additionally U-32 was equipped in 1915 with two  Uk L/30 deck guns.
The boat's complement was 4 officers and 31 enlisted.

Fate
 

Summary of raiding history

Original documents from Room 40

See also
Room 40

References

Notes

Citations

Bibliography

External links
Photos of cruises of German submarine U-54 in 1916-1918. Great photo quality, comments in German.
A 44 min. film from 1917 about a cruise of the German submarine U-35. A German propaganda film without dead or wounded; many details about submarine warfare in World War I.

Room 40:  original documents, photos and maps about World War I German submarine warfare and British Room 40 Intelligence from The National Archives, Kew, Richmond, UK.

German Type U 31 submarines
U-boats commissioned in 1914
Maritime incidents in 1918
U-boats sunk in 1918
World War I submarines of Germany
World War I shipwrecks in the Mediterranean Sea
U-boats sunk by depth charges
U-boats sunk by British warships
1914 ships
Ships built in Kiel
Ships lost with all hands